Formerly known as the Lightower Conference Classic, the Roc City Hoops Classic is an annual collegiate men's basketball event.  The event formerly featured a game played between two Atlantic 10 Conference NCAA Division-I member schools at Blue Cross Arena.

The event, started by St. Bonaventure University, brings NCAA Division-I basketball to Rochester, New York, the largest city in the United States of America without a full NCAA Division-I member school (however the RIT (Rochester Institute of Technology) Tigers have a men's and women's ice hockey program in Division I (Atlantic Hockey) in Henrietta, New York, along with the SUNY Brockport Golden Eagles in women's gymnastics and the Hobart College Statesmen in men's lacrosse (Northeast Conference) in the Rochester area (Brockport and Geneva, New York, respectively). While the early contests featured non-conference games, often with power conference teams, in 2014, with the rise of Atlantic 10 Conference's success in the NCAA National Tournament, the event moved to feature a conference matchup for the Bonnies men's basketball program.

Alesco Advisors is the presenting Sponsor for the event. Lightower Fiber Networks (formerly Fibertech), a Boxborough, MA based provider of fiber networks has held the title sponsorship from 2002-2016.

Classic History

References

 

College basketball rivalries in the United States
College men's basketball competitions in the United States
College basketball competitions
Siena Saints men's basketball
St. Bonaventure Bonnies men's basketball
2000 establishments in New York (state)
Recurring sporting events established in 2000